Pepys usually refers to Samuel Pepys (1633–1703), English naval administrator, Member of Parliament, and diarist.

Pepys may also refer to:

People
Talbot Pepys (1583–1666), English politician who sat in the House of Commons in 1625
Richard Pepys (1589–1659), English M.P. and Lord Chief Justice of Ireland, a remote cousin of the diarist
Roger Pepys (1617–1688), English lawyer and politician
Elisabeth Pepys (1640–1669), wife of Samuel Pepys
Sir Lucas Pepys, 1st Baronet (1742–1830), English physician
William Haseldine Pepys (1775–1856), English scientist
Charles Pepys, 1st Earl of Cottenham (1781–1851), British lawyer, judge, and politician
Henry Pepys (1783–1860), Church of England Bishop of Worcester
Emily Pepys (1833–1877), English child diarist
Mark Pepys, 6th Earl of Cottenham (1903–1943), motor racing driver, member of the House of Lords, and MI5 officer
Lady Rachel Pepys (1905–1992), Lady-in-Waiting to Princess Marina
Charles Henry Pepys Harington (1910–2007), officer in the British Army
George Christopher Cutts Pepys (1914–1974), Bishop of Buckingham from 1964 to 1974
Mark Pepys, English Head of Medicine at the Hampstead Campus and the Royal Free Hospital

Other uses
Pepys Street, in the City of London
Pepys Library, of Magdalene College, Cambridge
Pepys Island, a phantom island